Dionne Warwick & the Voices of Christmas is a studio album by American singer Dionne Warwick. It was released by Kind Music and BMG Rights Management on October 18, 2019. Featuring cover versions of Christmas standards and carols, Warwick collaborated with a variety of duet partners on the songs, including Eric Paslay, Aloe Blacc, Michael McDonald, Wanya Morris and duo Chloe x Halle. It debuted and peaked at number 48 on the US Top Holiday Albums.

Critical reception
Rolling Stone editor Connor Ratliff wrote that "there is a kind of Xmas album that a lot of people make and it is this album. If you like that album, here it is again! With Dionne Warwick! And friends!" He found that Dionne Warwick & the Voices of Christmas features "some nice arrangements! But mostly just the same songs, sung this time by Dionne Warwick and some guests."

Personnel 

Todd Hunter  – Piano/arrangements/producer
Steve Hass  – drums

All tracks produced by Damon Elliott.

Charts

Release history

References 

Dionne Warwick albums
2019 albums